George Keith Elphinstone, 1st Viscount Keith  (7 January 1746 – 10 March 1823), was a British naval officer active throughout the Napoleonic Wars.

Career

Early service
George Elphinstone was the fourth son of Charles Elphinstone, 10th Lord Elphinstone, and his wife Lady Clementina Fleming, the daughter and heiress of John Fleming, 6th Earl of Wigtown. Elphinstone was born on 7 January 1746 at Elphinstone Tower, Scotland. Of his three elder brothers, two joined the British Army while the third, William Fullerton Elphinstone, initially served in the Royal Navy before joining the East India Company. Elphinstone followed his third brother into the navy, joining the 100-gun ship of the line  on 4 November 1761. He stayed in her only briefly, transferring to the 44-gun frigate , commanded by Captain John Jervis, on 1 January of the following year.

Serving in Gosport on the North American Station, Elphinstone saw action in the campaign that culminated in the removal of the French from Newfoundland at the Battle of Signal Hill in September. At the end of the year Gosport sailed back to Britain, and in March of the following year Elphinstone left her to join the 32-gun frigate HMS Juno. He stayed in Juno only briefly, transferring from her to the 20-gun frigate HMS Lively after two months. As part of the Mediterranean Fleet, Elphinstone served in Lively until January 1765, at which point he went on leave at home. His leave over, Elphinstone was next appointed to serve on the 32-gun frigate HMS Emerald in August 1766. In December, however, he obtained permission from his captain to leave Emerald in order to join his brother William's East India Company ship, Tryton, as third mate on a trip to China. The two brother's uncle, George Keith, 10th Earl Marischal, lent each £2,000 for the journey, which money allowed them to profit from the expedition. He became lieutenant in 1770, commander in 1772, and post captain in 1775.

Post-Captain
During the war in America he was employed against the privateers, and with a naval brigade at the occupation of Charleston, South Carolina. In January 1781, when in command of the 50-gun , he captured a Dutch 50-gun ship which had beaten off a British vessel of equal strength a few days before. On  15 September 1782 in the Delaware Bay he led a squadron that captured  the French 38 gun frigate Aigle during which Captain Latouche Tréville was taken prisoner. After peace was signed he remained on shore for ten years, serving in Parliament as member first for Dunbartonshire, and then for Stirlingshire. He was elected a fellow of the Royal Society in 1790.

Admiral
When war broke out again in 1793, he was appointed to the 74-gun , in which he took part in the occupation of Toulon by Samuel Hood, 1st Viscount Hood. He particularly distinguished himself by beating a body of the French ashore at the head of a naval brigade of British and Spaniards. He was entrusted with the duty of embarking the fugitives when the town was evacuated. In 1794 he was promoted rear-admiral, and in 1795 he was sent to occupy the Dutch colonies in South Africa thereby establishing the Cape of Good Hope Station. He had a large share in the capture of the Cape in 1795, and in August 1796 captured a whole Dutch squadron in Saldanha Bay. In the interval he had gone on to India, where his health suffered, and the capture at Saldanha was effected on his way home. When the Nore Mutiny broke out in 1797 he was appointed to the command, and was soon able to restore order. He was equally successful at Plymouth, where the squadron was also in a state of effervescence.

At the close of 1798, he was sent as second in command to St Vincent. It was for a long time a thankless post, for St Vincent was at once half incapacitated by ill-health and very arbitrary, while Horatio Nelson, who considered that Keith's appointment was a personal slight to himself, was peevish and insubordinate. In May 1799, he was unable to counter Bruix' expedition, mainly due to sparring among the British naval commanders. Keith followed the enemy to Brest on their retreat, but was unable to bring them to action.

He returned to the Mediterranean in November as commander-in-chief. He co-operated with the Austrians in the siege of Genoa, which surrendered on 4 June 1800. It was however immediately afterwards lost in consequence of the Battle of Marengo, and the French made their re-entry so rapidly that the admiral had considerable difficulty in getting his ships out of the harbour. The close of 1801 and the beginning of the following year were spent in transporting the army sent to recover Egypt from the French. As the naval force of the enemy was completely driven into port, the British admiral had no opportunity of an action at sea, but his management of the convoy carrying the troops, and of the landing at Aboukir, was greatly admired.

He was made Baron Keith of the United Kingdom, an Irish barony having been conferred on him in 1797. On the renewal of the war in 1803 he was appointed Commander-in-Chief, North Sea (which at the time included Nore Command), which post he held until 1807. In February 1812 he was appointed commander-in-chief in the English Channel, and in 1814 he was raised to a viscountcy. During his last two commands he was engaged first in overlooking the measures taken to meet a threatened invasion, and then in directing the movements of the numerous small squadrons and private ships employed on the coasts of Spain and Portugal, and in protecting trade.

The decisions of the British government were expressed through him to the fallen Emperor. Lord Keith refused to be led into disputes, and confined himself to declaring steadily that he had his orders to obey. He was not much impressed by the appearance of his illustrious charge and thought that the airs of Napoleon and his suite were ridiculous. Lord Keith died in 1823 at Tulliallan Castle, near Kincardine-on-Forth, Fife, his property in Scotland, and was buried in the parish church.

Family life
He was twice married: in 1787 to Jane Mercer, daughter of Colonel William Mercer of Aldie; and in 1808 to Hester Thrale, daughter of Henry Thrale and Hester Thrale, who is spoken of as 'Queeney' in Boswell's Life of Johnson and Mme d'Arblay's Diary. He had a daughter by each marriage, the second being Georgina Augusta Henrietta Keith, but no son. Thus the viscountcy became extinct on his death, but the British and Irish baronies descended to his elder daughter Margaret (1788–1867), who married the Comte de Flahault de la Billarderie, only to become extinct on her death.

A portrait of him by Owen is in the Painted Hall in Greenwich and another by George Sanders in the National Maritime Museum, Greenwich.

Freemasonry
He was initiated into Scottish Freemasonry in Lodge Holyrood House (St Luke's), No. 44, on 16 June 1769.

In fiction
Lord Keith and his wife 'Queeney' appear in several of the novels in Patrick O'Brian's Aubrey–Maturin series. He is also mentioned in passing in Robert Brightwell's novel Flashman and the Seawolf, based loosely on the exploits of Thomas, Lord Cochrane (as is, in part, the character of Jack Aubrey).

Arms

Citations

References

Further reading
McCrannie, Kevin. Admiral Lord Keith and the Naval War against Napoleon (New Perspectives on Maritime History and Nautical Archaeology). April 30, 2006 
  Mercer, Keith. Mercer on McCranie, 'Admiral Lord Keith and the Naval War against Napoleon'. Beyond Nelson: The Life of a Forgotten British Admiral. Reviewed by Keith Mercer (Department of History, Dalhousie University, Halifax, Nova Scotia) Published on H-Maritime (November, 2006)

External links

 
 Keith's Papers  slowly being put online here.

|-

|-

|-

|-

|-

|-

1746 births
1823 deaths
People from Falkirk (council area)
Royal Navy admirals
Royal Navy personnel of the American Revolutionary War
Royal Navy personnel of the French Revolutionary Wars
Royal Navy personnel of the Napoleonic Wars
Scottish businesspeople
Peers of Ireland created by George III
Peers of the United Kingdom created by George III
Viscounts in the Peerage of the United Kingdom
Younger sons of barons
Knights Grand Cross of the Order of the Bath
Knights of the Order of the Crescent
Fellows of the Royal Society
Members of the Parliament of Great Britain for Scottish constituencies
British MPs 1780–1784
British MPs 1784–1790
British MPs 1796–1800
Members of the Parliament of the United Kingdom for Scottish constituencies
UK MPs 1801–1802
UK MPs who were granted peerages
Members of the Parliament of the United Kingdom for Stirling constituencies